Lazar Vidic (born 10 July 1989) is a Serbian football striker who plays for FK Dinamo Vranje.

External links
 

1989 births
Living people
Serbian footballers
Expatriate footballers in Myanmar
Ayeyawady United F.C. players
Lynx F.C. players
Association football forwards